Puf Böreği  is a deep-fried turnover with a filling of ground or minced meat and onions or peynir and parsley, dill.

Varieties in Ottoman Cuisine 
In the first Ottoman printed cookbook, Melceü't-Tabbâhîn, there is a recipe as puf böreği.

See also

 List of stuffed dishes
 Curry puff
 Empanada
 Gözleme
 Haliva, a similar Circassian pastry
 Khuushuur, a similar kind of meat pastry in Mongolian cuisine
 Lángos
 Lörtsy, a similar kind of pastry in Finnish cuisine
 Pastel (food)
 Pasty
 Peremech
 Plăcintă
 Qutab
 Sha phaley, a similar Tibetan pastry

Notes

References

Savoury pies
Deep fried foods
Turkish cuisine
Snack foods
Street food
Stuffed dishes
Ottoman cuisine
Turkish pastries